Beta Ethniki 2001–02 complete season.

League table

Originally score was 1-1. The game forfeited 2-0 for Panegialios.

Results

Top scorers

References

External links 
RSSSF.org

Second level Greek football league seasons
Greece
2